TWU may refer to:
 Telecommunications Workers Union, Canada
 Texas Wesleyan University, Fort Worth, US
 Texas Woman's University, Denton, US
 Tin Wu stop, Hong Kong - MTR station code TWU
 Transport Workers Union of America
 Transport Workers Union of Australia
 TransWorld University, Yunlin, Taiwan
 Trinity Western University, Langley, British Columbia, Canada
 Tawau Airport, Sabah, Malaysia – IATA code TWU